Sir Lovelace Tomlinson Stamer, 3rd Baronet, VD (18 October 182929 October 1908) was the first Anglican Bishop of Shrewsbury in the modern era.

Life
Lovelace Stamer was born into an Anglo-Irish noble family at York. He succeeded to the family baronetcy, originally created in 1809 for his grandfather, twice Lord Mayor of Dublin, following the death of his father in 1860.

He was educated at Rugby and Trinity College, Cambridge, where he took part in his college's first rowing crew and graduated BA in 1835 and MA in 1856, and was awarded degree as DD in 1888. Ordained priest in 1855, he began his career with curacies at Clay Cross, Derbyshire, in 1853-54 and Turvey in 1854. There then followed a short spell as Curate-in-charge at Long Melford, Suffolk before in 1858 he was appointed the Rector of Stoke-on-Trent, a position he held for 34 years.

When he arrived at Stoke, there was one Anglican parish church (now known as Stoke Minster) in the growing Potteries town.  He led an improvement in local ministry to the area, leaving it with four Anglican churches, and five school or mission churches.

He was also keenly interested in education, helping found night schools for working men in 1863, and was Chairman of the Stoke Schools Board from its founding in 1871.  He took part in local government by serving as Chief Bailiff of Stoke (equivalent to the later mayor of the borough) in 1867–68. He was from 1860 honorary chaplain to the area's volunteer infantry force, later the 1st Volunteer Battalion, North Staffordshire Regiment, and was ultimately awarded the Volunteer Decoration (VD).

He was made a prebendary of Lichfield Cathedral in 1875 and served as Archdeacon of Stoke from 1877 until he left the parish for Shropshire after being elevated to the episcopate in 1888 as Suffragan Bishop of Shrewsbury.  In Shrewsbury he was known for protesting over urban housing conditions and, as chaplain to its corporation, municipal corruption, for almost two decades until retiring due to illness in 1906, a period that coincided with also serving as Rector of St Chad's, Shrewsbury 1892–96, and of Edgmond, Shropshire 1896–1905. In the latter parish, he built new schools for local children, founded a working men's club and reading rooms, and paid for a new water supply system

He died at Penkridge, Staffordshire, on 29 October 1908 aged 79 and was buried in Stoke at Hartshill Cemetery. 
A hundred years on from his death, his contribution to the area was honoured at a centenary service.

Notes

1829 births
1908 deaths
People educated at Rugby School
Alumni of Trinity College, Cambridge
Anglican bishops of Shrewsbury
Archdeacons of Stoke
Baronets in the Baronetage of the United Kingdom